Sunzhensky (masculine), Sunzhenskaya (feminine), or Sunzhenskoye (neuter) may refer to:
Sunzhensky District, name of several districts in Russia
Sunzhensky otdel, former district of the Russian Empire
Sunzhensky (inhabited locality) (Sunzhenskaya, Sunzhenskoye), name of several rural localities in Russia